"PSA" is a song by American singer-songwriter SZA, used in the teaser for her second studio album, SOS (2022). It premiered on her 33rd birthday on November 8, 2022, and featured the word "SOS" in Morse code at the end, hinting at the album's title. In the song, backed by vocal harmonies, soft piano, and harps, SZA raps with braggadocio, demanding people to call her "number one", telling them to serve her, and angering someone to amuse herself.

Even though it was used to tease the album, the song did not appear in the 23-track final cut of SOS. SZA later said in a press interview that it was one out of many songs she might include in a deluxe edition of the album. A month after the album was released, on January 5, 2023, she released a digital-exclusive edition of SOS via Top Dawg Entertainment's website. "PSA" appears as one of the edition's two bonus tracks.

Background 
SZA released her debut studio album, Ctrl, in 2017. Primarily an R&B album that deals with themes like heartbreak, Ctrl received widespread critical acclaim and brought SZA to mainstream success. Critics credit it with establishing her status as a major figure in contemporary pop and R&B music and pushing the boundaries of the R&B genre. Her next studio album was therefore highly anticipated, and she alluded to its completion as early as August 2019 during an interview with DJ Kerwin Frost. 

In the meantime, SZA had been collaborating with other artists on singles, releasing "What Lovers Do" with Maroon 5 in 2017, "All the Stars" with Kendrick Lamar and "I Do" with Cardi B in 2018, and "Staring at the Sun" with Post Malone in 2019. In 2020, "Hit Different" and "Good Days" were released—the two marked her first solo songs since Ctrl and hence fueled anticipation for a new album. She followed it up with two more solo singles in the coming years: "I Hate U" in 2021 and "Shirt" in October 2022.

From April to May 2022, SZA told media outlets that she had recently finished the album in Hawaii and said that it was coming soon. Her 33rd birthday came on November 8, several weeks after the release of "Shirt". To celebrate the occasion, a video was uploaded to her YouTube account, and she reposted it on social media with the caption: "Happy birthday to me. Clock starts now."

Teaser 
The video posted to YouTube was a teaser for the upcoming album. The teaser is directed by Bradley J. Calder, and it uses a song titled "PSA". Nearly two minutes long, it features alternating shots of SZA in two scenes: in one, she wears a brown bikini and crouches in a ring of neon green fire, and in the other, she pours blue, fluorescent liquid over her naked self by a beach. As the teaser ends, she makes her way towards the sea, and the video cuts to black before playing Morse code that translates to "SOS".

The instruments in "PSA" consist of soft piano and harps, alongside several background vocal harmonies. SZA raps the lyrics with braggadocio: she demands people call her nothing but the "number one" and serve her, admitting to insisting this because she needs to curb feelings of envy and find a way to cope with her problems: "I don't know how to take losses / Even when, even when they are lost causes." Later, she proceeds to anger someone for her own pleasure—"pissing you off just to get off"—then mocks certain "bottom feeders" who "suck dick by the liter", perceiving them as of less value than her. She closes the song with the lines: "You should go cry about it, not trying to fight about it."

Release 
In a Billboard cover story published a week later, SZA revealed that the title of her second album was SOS, scheduled for release sometime next month. Shortly before release, she shared a photo of the cover art on social media; it features her alone in the middle of the ocean. SOS was released on December 9, 2022, and it debuted atop the Billboard 200 chart, keeping Taylor Swift's Midnights (2022) off the top spot and giving SZA her first number 1 album in the United States. It spent its first three weeks on the Billboard 200 at number 1.

Despite being used for the teaser, "PSA" was not included as one of the 23 songs in the album's final cut. SZA said that Punch, president of her label Top Dawg Entertainment, ordered not to include unreleased tracks like "PSA" on the standard edition despite her and her fans' wishes because it did not fit with his vision for SOS. In her words, "He just has a very strong opinion about curation." As a response, she suggested that the song could be included as a bonus track in a deluxe edition of an album.

The tracking week ending January 6, 2023, marked SOS fourth week on the Billboard 200; there was a possibility that Midnights might overtake the album and gain the number 1 spot. On January 5, when tracking was about to end, SZA and Swift released digital versions of their albums that contained bonus material, which would boost both albums' chart performance. In SZA's case, she released a digital-exclusive edition of SOS that can be bought only on Top Dawg's website. It consisted of all 23 songs from the standard edition alongside 2 previously-unreleased songs—"PSA" was one of them.

Live performances 
SZA debuted "PSA" during a 19-show North American tour in support of SOS. Specifically, she first played the song during her concert at the Schottenstein Center in Columbus, Ohio, on February 21, 2023. Her set lists often started with "PSA", which she performed as she recreated the album cover art on stage, atop a diving board with a screen behind her that projected a video of the ocean. When she was done with the song, she appeared to dive onto the stage floor.

Notes

References 

2023 songs
Songs written by SZA
SZA songs